Mitchell White (born 28 March 1973) is a former Australian rules football (AFL) player who played for the West Coast Eagles and Geelong.

Along with Glen Jakovich, White was a priority draft choice from WA in 1990. In 1996 he was outstanding after being switched to center half forward after being a defender for his whole career. If it hadn't been for some school mates he would have probably kept playing rugby league and he did not play competitive football till his early teens. By 17 he was playing senior football for Subiaco. He played just two games for the Eagles in 1991 then advanced to be part of the 1992 flag side. A severe groin injury wrecked his 1993 and most of the 1994 season. Not a big marking player, he was very mobile and had strong hands. Although he wasn't a high-profile player he was considered to be a key performer by other clubs. He made the 1996 All-Australian team. Great stamina was his trademark. Early in 1997 he injured a knee which sidelined him for a year. White reached the position of vice-captain in 2000 but was traded at the end of the year. At Geelong in 2001 he was an effective forward but only managed 7 games in the next two seasons which signaled his retirement.

Statistics

|-
|- style="background-color: #EAEAEA"
! scope="row" style="text-align:center" | 1991
|style="text-align:center;"|
| 47 || 2 || 0 || 0 || 15 || 7 || 22 || 6 || 3 || 0.0 || 0.0 || 7.5 || 3.5 || 11.0 || 3.0 || 1.5 || 0
|-
|style="text-align:center;background:#afe6ba;"|1992†
|style="text-align:center;"|
| 31 || 22 || 4 || 2 || 151 || 80 || 231 || 53 || 26 || 0.2 || 0.1 || 6.9 || 3.6 || 10.5 || 2.4 || 1.2 || 0
|- style="background-color: #EAEAEA"
! scope="row" style="text-align:center" | 1993
|style="text-align:center;"|
| 12 || 20 || 1 || 9 || 156 || 111 || 267 || 68 || 27 || 0.1 || 0.5 || 7.8 || 5.6 || 13.4 || 3.4 || 1.4 || 0
|-
! scope="row" style="text-align:center" | 1994
|style="text-align:center;"|
| 12 || 6 || 3 || 0 || 48 || 14 || 62 || 21 || 9 || 0.5 || 0.0 || 8.0 || 2.3 || 10.3 || 3.5 || 1.5 || 0
|- style="background-color: #EAEAEA"
! scope="row" style="text-align:center" | 1995
|style="text-align:center;"|
| 12 || 23 || 2 || 2 || 179 || 134 || 313 || 102 || 30 || 0.1 || 0.1 || 7.8 || 5.8 || 13.6 || 4.4 || 1.3 || 1
|-
! scope="row" style="text-align:center" | 1996
|style="text-align:center;"|
| 12 || 23 || 37 || 15 || 262 || 133 || 395 || 143 || 29 || 1.6 || 0.7 || 11.4 || 5.8 || 17.2 || 6.2 || 1.3 || 6
|- style="background-color: #EAEAEA"
! scope="row" style="text-align:center" | 1997
|style="text-align:center;"|
| 12 || 5 || 4 || 3 || 42 || 27 || 69 || 18 || 6 || 0.8 || 0.6 || 8.4 || 5.4 || 13.8 || 3.6 || 1.2 || 0
|-
! scope="row" style="text-align:center" | 1998
|style="text-align:center;"|
| 12 || 14 || 11 || 10 || 118 || 59 || 177 || 57 || 14 || 0.8 || 0.7 || 8.4 || 4.2 || 12.6 || 4.1 || 1.0 || 0
|- style="background-color: #EAEAEA"
! scope="row" style="text-align:center" | 1999
|style="text-align:center;"|
| 12 || 24 || 29 || 14 || 241 || 144 || 385 || 131 || 13 || 1.2 || 0.6 || 10.0 || 6.0 || 16.0 || 5.5 || 0.5 || 0
|-
! scope="row" style="text-align:center" | 2000
|style="text-align:center;"|
| 12 || 12 || 12 || 5 || 81 || 54 || 135 || 45 || 10 || 1.0 || 0.4 || 6.8 || 4.5 || 11.3 || 3.8 || 0.8 || 0
|- style="background-color: #EAEAEA"
! scope="row" style="text-align:center" | 2001
|style="text-align:center;"|
| 19 || 16 || 16 || 12 || 116 || 87 || 203 || 78 || 22 || 1.0 || 0.8 || 7.3 || 5.4 || 12.7 || 4.9 || 1.4 || 0
|-
! scope="row" style="text-align:center" | 2002
|style="text-align:center;"|
| 19 || 5 || 2 || 3 || 33 || 18 || 51 || 14 || 13 || 0.4 || 0.6 || 6.6 || 3.6 || 10.2 || 2.8 || 2.6 || 0
|- style="background-color: #EAEAEA"
! scope="row" style="text-align:center" | 2003
|style="text-align:center;"|
| 19 || 2 || 3 || 0 || 13 || 2 || 15 || 8 || 1 || 1.5 || 0.0 || 6.5 || 1.0 || 7.5 || 4.0 || 0.5 || 0
|- class="sortbottom"
! colspan=3| Career
! 174
! 124
! 75
! 1455
! 870
! 2325
! 744
! 203
! 0.7
! 0.4
! 8.4
! 5.0
! 13.4
! 4.3
! 1.2
! 7
|}

References

External links

 
 

Geelong Football Club players
West Coast Eagles players
West Coast Eagles Premiership players
1973 births
Living people
Subiaco Football Club players
All-Australians (AFL)
Australian rules footballers from Perth, Western Australia
People educated at Carine Senior High School
Western Australian State of Origin players
One-time VFL/AFL Premiership players